Shahaji (22 January 1802 - 29 November 1838) was Raja of Kolhapur of Bhonsle dynasty. He was as regent from 2 July 1821 to 3 January 1822 and ruled as monarch from 3 January 1822 to 29 November 1838. He was succeeded by Shivaji V.

Sources

Maharajas of Kolhapur
1802 births
1838 deaths